Seth Rogen is a Canadian actor, writer, and producer of film and television.

He is most known for his performances in comedies such as The 40-Year-Old Virgin (2005), Knocked Up (2007), Superbad (2007), Pineapple Express (2008), Zack and Miri Make a Porno (2008), Observe and Report (2009), Funny People (2009), This is the End (2013), Neighbors (2014),  The Interview, The Night Before (2015), and The Disaster Artist (2017). He is also known for his performances in the independent dramas, Take This Waltz (2011), 50/50 (2011), and Steve Jobs (2015).

He is also known for his voice performances in Shrek the Third (2007), Horton Hears a Who! (2008), Kung Fu Panda film series (2008-2016), Monsters vs. Aliens (2009), and The Lion King (2019).

Major associations

Emmy Awards

Golden Globe Awards

Independent Spirit Awards

Screen Actors Guild Awards

Audience awards

American Comedy Awards

MTV Movie Award

Nickelodeon Kids' Choice Award

Teen Choice Award

People's Choice Award

Young Artist Award

Critics awards

Miscellaneous awards

Notes

References 

Rogen, Seth
Rogen, Seth